The Gempylidae are a family of perciform fishes commonly known as snake mackerels or escolars. The family includes about 25 species.

They are elongated fishes with a similar appearance to barracudas, having a long dorsal fin, usually with one or finlets trailing it. The largest species, including the snoek (Thyrsites atun), grow up to 2 m long, and the oilfish (Ruvettus pretiosus) can reach 3 m, though they rarely surpass 150 cm. Like the barracudas, they are predators, with fang-like teeth.

They are deep-water benthopelagic fishes, and several species are important commercial and game fishes.

Timeline

See also
Euzaphlegidae, an extinct group of relatives from Paleocene to Late Miocene-aged marine strata of Europe, the Caucasus Mountains, India, Iran, Turkmenistan, Italy, and Southern California.

References

External links

 
Scientia Marina - Population biology of the roudi escolar Promethichthys prometheus (Gempylidae) off the Canary Islands
Deep water fish species - Lanzarote

 
Ray-finned fish families